Ramon Bloomberg (born 1972 in Sheffield,England) is a writer and film maker based in London.

Filmography 
 2014 – T's World: The Over-identification of Terry Thompson,  30 min, color, HD

 2013 – Glacis, 30 min, color, HD
 2011 – Trans Vector, 15 min, color HD
 2010 – Chinese Shadows, 15 min, color, 35mm
French language, Funded by France 2 TV and CNC France.
Aix en Provence film fest 2008, Cleremont Ferrand 2009
Distribution, France 2,  2009
 2008 – Green Spirit, 3 min, color, HD
 2006 – Horse Territory, 5 min. Color 35mm
Saatchi and Saatchi New Director's showcase, Cannes 2007, Clermont Ferrand 2007, AFI film festival 2008.
 2000 – Area K, Documentary, 52 min. Color DV
Brooklyn International Film Festival 2003 : Best Film
San Francisco International Film Festival 2003 : Certificate of merit
BBC World 2003, Sky TV 2003

References

Sources 
Ramon Bloomberg at the Music Video Database
 https://web.archive.org/web/20141105022930/http://www.dok-leipzig.de/festival/preistraeger-2014

External links
 Official site
 

1972 births
Living people
Writers from Sheffield
English music video directors
English film directors